Norah Telford Burnard (14 July 1902–27 February 1979) was a New Zealand school dental supervisor and journal editor. She was born in Clareville, Wairarapa, New Zealand on 14 July 1902.

References

1902 births
1979 deaths
New Zealand writers
New Zealand dentists
20th-century dentists